My Foot is an album released by The Pillows on January 12, 2006 in Japan and on July 4, 2006 in the United States. The album was produced by Zin Yoshida of Salon Music and Terry Ho.

Reception
The album currently holds a rating of 3.46 at Rate Your Music.

Music
Rhythm guitarist and vocalist Sawao Yamanaka explained that this album emphasizes combination of simple sounds, particularly through use of twin guitar.

Track listing
All songs by Sawao Yamanaka.
 "My Foot"
 "Rock'n'Roll Sinners"
 "The Air Resistor" (空中レジスター)
 "The Third Eye" (サード アイ)
 "Mighty Lovers"
 "Non Fiction" (ノンフィクション)
 "Degeneration"
 "March of the God"
 "My Girl (Document Version)"
 "Sayonara Universe" (さよならユニバース)
 "Gazelle City"

References

The Pillows albums
2006 albums